Zebrahead (Soundtrack From the Original Motion Picture) is the soundtrack to Anthony Drazan's 1992 drama film Zebrahead. It was released on October 13, 1992 via Ruffhouse Records and Sony Music Entertainment. The soundtrack is best known for containing Nas's debut single "Halftime".

Track listing

Personnel
Kevin Reynolds – engineering (track 1)
Manuel Lecuona – engineering & mixing (track 3)
Joseph Mario Nicolo – engineering & mixing (track 3)
Anton Pukshansky – engineering (track 5)
Jeff Toone – engineering (tracks: 4, 7, 9)
Tony Dawsey – mastering
Mark Pearson – executive producer
Marcus Wyns – art direction

References

External links 

1992 soundtrack albums
Hip hop soundtracks
Columbia Records soundtracks
Albums produced by Tricky Stewart
Albums produced by Large Professor
Albums recorded at Chung King Studios
Romance film soundtracks
Thriller film soundtracks